Guillermo Gutiérrez may refer to:

 Guillermo Gutiérrez (athlete) (born 1927), Venezuelan Olympic sprinter
 Guillermo Gutiérrez (cyclist) (born 1964), Mexican Olympic cyclist